Henry FitzRoy may refer to:

Henry FitzRoy (died 1158) (c. 1103–1158), illegitimate son of Henry I of England
Henry FitzRoy, Duke of Richmond and Somerset (1519–1536), the only illegitimate child acknowledged by Henry VIII
Henry FitzRoy, 1st Duke of Grafton (1663–1690), illegitimate son of Charles II of Great Britain
Henry FitzRoy (cricketer) (1765–1794), English cricketer
Henry FitzRoy, 5th Duke of Grafton (1790–1863), descendant of the 1st Duke of Grafton
Henry FitzRoy (politician) (1807–1859), First Commissioner of Works during the mid-19th century
Henry James FitzRoy, Earl of Euston (1848–1912), eldest son of Augustus FitzRoy, 7th Duke of Grafton
Henry FitzRoy, 12th Duke of Grafton (born 1978), present Duke of Grafton